Krog may refer to:

 Antjie Krog (born 1952), South African writer
 Cecilie Thoresen Krog (1858–1911), Norwegian women's rights activist
 Eli Krog (1891–1970), Norwegian translator
 Frank Krog (1954–2008), Norwegian actor
 Georg Krog (1915–1991), Norwegian speed skater
 Gina Krog (1847–1916), Norwegian women's rights activist
 Helge Krog (1889–1962), Norwegian writer
 Hildur Krog (1922–2014), Norwegian botanist
 Jason Krog (born 1975), Professional ice hockey player
 Jørn Aksel Krog (born 1948), Norwegian civil servant
 Karin Krog (born 1937), Norwegian jazz singer
 Nicolai Johan Lohmann Krog (1787–1856), Norwegian politician
 Peder Krog (1654–1731), Danish-Norwegian bishop

See also
 Krogh
 Krohg

fr:Krok (homonymie)